The 1945–46 season was Manchester United's seventh and last season in the non-competitive War League during the Second World War. With the ending of the war, the FA Cup returned in January 1946, with Manchester United losing 3–2 on aggregate to Preston North End in the Fourth Round.

Matt Busby had been appointed as the successor to Walter Crickmer as manager in February 1945, and officially took over the position on 1 October, following his demobilisation from the British Army. He was joined by head coach Jimmy Murphy in early 1946.

War League North Regional League

FA Cup

Squad statistics

References

Manchester United F.C. seasons
Manchester United